Pollagh is a village on Achill Island off the coast of County Mayo. It is surrounded by the villages of Keel, County Mayo and Dooagh.

Controversy 

In November 2019, Pollagh became the scene of controversy after local people began a three month-long 24/7 protest to prevent refugees being accommodated in the Achill Head Hotel in the village. Because of the protest, the Department of Justice, which is responsible for refugees in the direct provision system, decided that staying in Pollagh was not in the best interests of the vulnerable female refugees concerned. Protesters insisted their motivation wasn't racist, a stance that was met with skepticism from some quarters. The protest petered out after just two weeks.

References

External links 
 

Villages in Achill Island